Kangta & Best is a greatest hits album released in 2006 by Kangta. The album is compiled from his first three solo albums and songs from the group S.

Track listing
Disc 1 - CD
 Polaris
 Falling In Love
 Pine Tree
 Paralysis
 Thanks God
 Memories
 Reminiscence #1
 The Best
 Illusion
 One Snowing Day
 My Life
 Persona
 Happy Happy
 Memories #2
 1 Rainy Day
Disc 2 - DVD Region 2
 Polaris
 Thanks God
 Memories
 Propose
 Confession
 Persona
 I Swear (Group S)
 I Was... (Group S)
 Love Is... (Group S])
 Special Interview

External links
 Kangta's official website
 SM Entertainment's official website
 Group S' official website

2006 greatest hits albums
Kangta albums
2006 video albums
Music video compilation albums
SM Entertainment compilation albums
SM Entertainment video albums